The Best of Lynn Anderson is a compilation album by American country artist Lynn Anderson. It was released in December 1968 via Chart Records and was produced by Slim Williamson. It was the first compilation released in Anderson's music career and the first of several to be released on the Chart label. The album featured her most popular recordings occurring in the first several years of her music career. Twelve tracks were included on the album release.

Background, release and reception
The Best of Lynn Anderson contained previously-recorded hits made popular by Anderson in her early years at Chart Records. The songs were first recorded between 1966 and 1968 at the RCA Victor Studio, located in Nashville, Tennessee. All sessions were produced by Slim Williamson. Twelve tracks were included on the album. Of the songs featured, three were previously top ten hits for Anderson on the Billboard Hot Country Songs chart: "If I Kiss You (Will You Go Away)," "Promises, Promises" and "No Another Time." Two tracks were top 20 hits on the same chart: "Big Girls Don't Cry" and "I've Been Everywhere." Five songs on the album were additional cuts that were not issued as singles.

The Best of Lynn Anderson was released in December 1968 via Chart Records. It was Anderson's first compilation issued in her career and the first of several issued on Chart. The album was issued as a vinyl LP containing six songs on each side of the record. The Best of Lynn Anderson spent a total of 15 weeks on the Billboard Top Country Albums chart before reaching number 29 in March 1969. It additionally reached number 180 on the Billboard 200 albums chart, becoming her first appearance on the latter survey. The album received positive reception from Allmusic, which rated the release with 4.5 out of 5 stars.

Track listing

Personnel
All credits are adapted from the liner notes of The Best of Lynn Anderson.

Musical and technical personnel
 Lynn Anderson – lead vocals
 Tom Pick – engineering
 Glenn Sutton – liner notes
 Bill Vandevort – engineering
 Slim Williamson – producer

Chart performance

Release history

References

1968 albums
Albums produced by Slim Williamson
Chart Records albums
Lynn Anderson compilation albums